Free the Universe is the second full-length studio album released by Major Lazer, collaborative music group headed by record producer Diplo. The album was released on April 16, 2013, and features appearances by Vampire Weekend's Ezra Koenig, Dirty Projectors' Amber Coffman, Santigold, Peaches, Tyga, Flux Pavilion, Bruno Mars, Wyclef Jean, Shaggy, and more. The album peaked at No. 34 in both the Billboard 200 and the UK Albums Chart.

Track listing

Notes
  signifies an additional producer.
 "Wind Up" features additional vocals by Chippy Nonstop.
 "Reach for the Stars" features additional vocals by Jarina De Marco.

Chart positions

Weekly charts

Year-end charts

References

2013 albums
Major Lazer albums
Albums produced by Major Lazer
Secretly Canadian albums
Post-dubstep albums
Bounce music albums